Hector Rosales (born April, 1958 in Montevideo) is an Uruguayan poet and writer. As a child, he lived in the Aires Puros barrio (neighborhood) on Burges Avenue, near Fazenda Ipiranga Airport. He attended a local elementary school before moving up to the Mother Ana Lyceum. As a young adult, he went on to attend Dr. Eduardo Acevedo Institute in Montevideo, studying advocacy, where he went on the achieve a Baccalaureate in Law.

Early years 

Like many children, he was introduced to the wonderful stories of  literature at an early age, as his parents and grandparents read to him frequently, passing on their love of literature to young Hector. And as he grew into his teen years, the world of fiction provided a much-needed escape for Rosales. Through literature, he was able to experience the joys and happiness of life which the political turmoil in Uruguay, at that time, prevented him and others from enjoying.  The world around him, the real world, was filled with misery, unhappiness and despair as a result of violent tactics employed by the ruling political party that had recently overthrown Uruguay’s former democratic government.

On June 27, 1973, when Rosales was just fifteen years old, a military coup established itself as the new form of government in Uruguay. The suffocating, repressive atmosphere of economic, political and social decline that followed  that existed at the time of military rule, however, greatly influenced Rosales’s writings. In 1976, at eighteen years of age, he wrote his first short stories and poems, which express the sorrow and despair he felt about the political situation. These early works were not made public, but were simply passed around among friends and relatives to be read. Rosales would comment years later that these first writings had little aesthetic value and were written only as an outlet for his adolescent despair.

Career 

Between 1977-1978, Rosales wrote his first two books of poetry, Visions and Agonies and Night Mirrors. In  January 1979, he made the decision to leave the turmoil of Montevideo behind him, and move to Ruby, Spain., near Barcelona. He became a Spanish national in 1980 and continued to stay busy with various writing and media projects. He wrote numerous journal articles, collaborated on literary works with other writers, established the poets group known as “Group Now,” was involved in publishing, organized discussions, workshops, recitals, worked in graphic design, radio, and immersed himself in studying the works of Spanish poets. In 1992, he moved to Barcelona and from 1993-1995 he ran a language school there. From November 1994-September 1996, he edited the folios for The Leaves of the Flood, an anthology of Latin American and Spanish poets.

From 2000-2006, he was a member of the governing body of the English Library. He currently manages a group of schools in the Catalan capital of Barcelona.

Rosales   credits Juan Carlos Onetti (1909-1994), short story writer and novelist with having the greatest influence on its own
writings. Onetti was imprisoned in 1974 for disseminating a short story by Nelson Marra (“The Bodyguard”) whose subject matter offended the military dictatorship in Uruguay.

The works of Hector Rosales have been translated into English, Italian, German, Polish, Catalan and Galician. Rosales continues to write, at his leisure, away from the public and media splendor.  He also continues to promote the works of his fellow Uruguayan writers as well as continuing on with his travels, all things which he says are in a constant battle with his “unique and disproportionate enemy:time.”

Works 
Poetry
Visions and agonies (Barcelona, 1979, 2nd ed. revised and expanded, New Jersey, 2000)
Mirrors at night (Madrid, 1981)
Folder 1 (Barcelona, 1982)
Dende eigui / booklet (Pontevedra, 1983)
Spectra (Gijon, 1983)
Desvuelo (1st ed. Montevideo, Barcelona, 1984, 2nd ed. Revised and expanded: Barcelona, 1997, 3rd ed. 1999, 4th ed.-book, San Jose, Costa Rica, 2001, 5th ed. Pdf, Mexico 2004)
Four texts / fold (Barcelona, 1985)
Five poems (in supplement magazine “Calandrajas” No. 15, Toledo, 1987)
Rails / booklet (Barcelona, 1989)
Around the siege (Montevideo, three eds., 1989/92/93, first prize in 1992, the Ministry of Education and Culture, Uruguay)
Four postal Sweden / fold ( four eds., 1992/93/94 Barcelona, Mexico, ed. Pdf, 2005)
 Inhabitants cry incomplete (Montevideo, 1992)
The inverted spring / booklet (five eds., 1994/96/2003 Barcelona, the latter increased, and Santiago de Compostela, 1995, with Galician version integrating Olisbos University    Magazine, No. 17)
'While rain does not erase the traces  (Barcelona, 2002)

AnthologiesVoices in stone lit / Ten Uruguayan poet (Toledo, 1988)Chappies, the spines of the verse'' (Montevideo, 2001)

References

External links 
 http://www.palabravirtual.com/rosales/, Spanish poets reading selected works

Interviews
 http://www.jornaldepoesia.jor.br/bh17rosales1.htm, Spanish-language interview in the Journal of Poetry
 https://web.archive.org/web/20080509062642/http://www.joanmaragall.com/fronesis/2/bibliografies_i_entrevistes/hector_rosales/hector_rosales.html, Spanish-language interview with the poet

Newspapers
 http://www.letralia.com/98/articulo05.htm, Spanish-language newspaper from Venezuela
 http://www.letralia.com/100/articulo03.htm, Spanish-language newspaper from Venezuela

20th-century Uruguayan poets
Living people
1958 births
21st-century Uruguayan poets
21st-century Uruguayan male writers
Uruguayan male poets
20th-century Uruguayan male writers